Platinum is a musical with a book by Will Holt and Bruce Vilanch, music by Gary William Friedman, and lyrics by Holt. Set in a Hollywood recording studio, it centers on Lila Halliday, a star of 1940s and 1950s movie musicals who is attempting a comeback. In the process, she falls for a young rock star named Dan Danger.

Production history
Platinum was originally titled Sunset when it had its world premiere in 1977 at the Studio Arena Theater in Buffalo, New York. The production, with a book by Louis LaRusso II, was directed by Tommy Tune. When the musical evolved into Platinum and moved to Broadway, only the songwriters, Alexis Smith, Lisa Mordente, and ensemble member Christine Faith remained with the production.

Directed and choreographed by Joe Layton, the Broadway production of Platinum opened on November 12, 1978, at the Mark Hellinger Theatre, where it closed on December 10, 1978, after 33 performances and 12 previews. Despite its short run, it garnered Tony Award nominations for Smith and Richard Cox and Drama Desk Award nominations for Cox and Mordente. (A revised version of the original Sunset was presented off-Broadway at the Village Gate in November 1983. Starring Tammy Grimes and directed by Andre Ernotte it closed after one performance and 13 previews.)

In August 2010, a revised version of Platinum developed by UnsungMusicalsCo. Inc. played the New York International Fringe Festival. It was directed by Ben West with choreography by Rommy Sandhu.

1984 Village Gate NYC production

Musical Numbers
 Living on Sunset
 Nothing But
 The Funky
 Destiny
 Back With a Beat
 Standing In Need
 Rock is My Way of Life
 Sunset Dreams
 Dan's Rap
 Cheap Chablis
 Bug On The Windshield Of Life
 1945
 Retreat
 I Am The Light
 Moments
 Old Times, Good Times
 This One's for Me

Cast
 Lila Halliday - Tammy Grimes
 Danger Dan - Kim Milford
 Marta Gibson - Ronee Blakley
 Jamie - Walt Hunter

1978 Broadway production

Musical Numbers
Act One
 Back With a Beat/Nothing But
 Sunset
 Ride Baby Ride
 Destiny
 Disco Destiny
 I Am the Light
 Movie Star Mansion
Act Two
 Platinum Dreams
 Trials and Tribulations/I Like You
 1945
 Too Many Mirrors
 Old Times, Good Times

Cast
 Lila Halliday - Alexis Smith
 Dan Danger - Richard Cox
 Crystal Mason - Lisa Mordente
 Jeff Leff - Stanley Kamel
 Schultz - Tony Schultz
 Snake - Ronnie B. Baker
 Minky/Alan Fairmont - Jonathan Freeman
 Boris - John Hammil
 Avery - Avery Sommers
 Robin - Robin Grean
 Wenndy - Wenndy Leigh Mackenzie
 Christine - Christine Faith
 Damita - Damita Jo Freeman

1977 world premiere production

Musical Numbers
 Sunset City
 Nothing But
 Back With a Beat
 Rock is My Way of Life
 Destiny
 Disco Destiny
 Waltz
 Retreat
 Moments
 Montage
 Trials and Tribulations/I Like You
 True Music
 Retreat (Reprise)
 Good Time Song
 Finale

Cast
 Lila Halliday - Alexis Smith
 Randy Gold - Buddy Vest
 Crystal Newcomb - Lisa Mordente
 Jamie Bradbury - Bill Starr
 DJ Rollins - Ronald Perlman
 Twin - Yolanda Ray Raven
 Twin - Terry Rieser
 Session Singer - Cheryl Alexander
 Session Singer - Christine Faith
 Session Singer - Diva Gray

Awards and nominations
1978 Tony Award nominations
 Best Actress – Alexis Smith
 Best Featured Actor – Richard Cox
1978 Drama Desk Award nominations
 Best Featured Actress – Lisa Mordente
 Best Featured Actor – Richard Cox

1978 critical reception
Douglas Watt, reviewing in the New York Daily News said the musical was "full of electricity and sends you into the night charged up." Platinum was "the first big fat hit" of the Broadway season, and Smith was "vibrant and smashing looking." He singled out the songs "Destiny" and "Movie Star Mansion." In all, the show was "a triumphant piece of musical staging" that achieved "pure excitement."

Martin Gottfried called Friedman's music, "excellent - melodic, ambitious, ingenious, and decidedly theatrical", and Holt's lyrics "clean and crafty."

On the flip side, Walter Kerr said, "I have a feeling that if Platinum could just get rid of its book, its songs, its microphones and its almost arrogantly messy setting, it would be light miles ahead."

Contemporary Literary Critique
In his 2015 reference compilation The Complete Book Of 1970's Broadway Musicals, author Dan Dietz said that the lyrics by Will Holt and the Music by Gary William Friedman "offered an array of clever and melodic songs, and their Platinum score is one of the most underrated of the era."

Notes

References
 Mandelbaum, Ken, Not Since Carrie: Forty Years of Broadway Musical Flops. St. Martin's Press 1991. 
 Suskin, Steven, More Opening Nights on Broadway: A Critical Quotebook Of The Musical Theatre from 1965 Through 1981. Schirmer Books 1997. 
 Mordden, Ethan, One More Kiss: The Broadway Musical in the 1970s. Palgrave Macmillan 2004. 
 Sunset Playbill, Studio Arena Theatre, Buffalo, New York, 1977

External links
 
 Gary William Friedman official website

1978 musicals
Broadway musicals